The California Film Institute (CFI) is a non-profit film exhibition organization based in San Rafael, California. The organization exhibits films year-round at the Christopher B. Smith Rafael Film Center, presents the annual Mill Valley Film Festival and DOCLANDS Documentary Film Festival, and supports the year-round CFI Education Program. The founder and current director of CFI is Mark Fishkin.

Mill Valley Film Festival

Founded in 1978 by Mark Fishkin, the festival is held every October and screens over 200 US and international films for over 70,000 participants.

Christopher B. Smith Rafael Film Center

The Rafael Film Center is a non-profit independent three-screen arthouse theater located in downtown San Rafael, California. It has been owned and operated by the California Film Institute since 1999. The venue exhibits first-run independent and studio films, documentaries, classics, retrospectives, and world cinema, and hosts special events with filmmakers from the Bay Area and from around the world. The Film Center annually serves approximately 200,000 attendees.

References

Film festivals in California
Film organizations in the United States
Organizations based in California
Cinemas and movie theaters in the San Francisco Bay Area
Cinemas and movie theaters in California
Nonprofit cinemas and movie theaters in the United States